The W H Stocks Stakes is a Moonee Valley Racing Club Group 2 Thoroughbred horse race for mares aged four years old and over, held under weight for age conditions, over a distance of 1600 metres held annually in September at Moonee Valley Racecourse, Melbourne, Australia. The prizemoney is A$300,000.

History

Distance
 1973–1992 – 1600 metres
 1993 – 1616 metres
 1994 onwards - 1600 metres

Grade
 1973–1978 - Principal Race
 1979–1992 - Listed Race
 1993–2004 - Group 3
 2005 onwards - Group 2

Name
 1973–1979 - Dallas Handicap
 1980–2006 - W H Stocks Stakes
 2007 - Cranes Stakes
 2008 onwards - W H Stocks Stakes

Winners

 2020 - Mystic Journey
 2019 - Princess Jenni
 2018 - I Am A Star
 2017 - I Am A Star
 2016 - Don't Doubt Mamma
 2015 - Fenway
 2014 - Dear Demi
 2013 - Atlantic Jewel
 2012 - Oasis Bloom
 2011 - King's Rose
 2010 - Avienus
 2009 - Zarita
 2008 - Tuesday Joy
 2007 - Devil Moon
 2006 - Astrodame
 2005 - Flowerdrum
 2004 - She’s Archie
 2003 - Sunday Joy
 2002 - Gold Lottey
 2001 - Lady Marion
 2000 - Hula Wonder
 1999 - Sorrento
 1998 - Londolozi
 1997 - Sweet Delight
 1996 - Arctic Scent
 1995 - The Penny
 1994 - Alcove
 1993 - Bon Precieux
 1992 - Gatherneaux
 1991 - Pacific
 1990 - Natural Wonder
 1989 - Top Dance
 1988 - Hazy Pond
 1987 - Gielgud’s Belle
 1986 - Rompalong
 1985 - Digger’s Lass
 1984 - Change The Tune
 1983 - Matternot
 1982 - Fiery Pax
 1981 - Countess Caboul
 1980 - Dondal
 1979 - Country Belle
 1978 - Bold Bridget
 1977 - race not held
 1976 - Princess Veronica
 1975 - Hot Cross
 1974 - Dowling Lass
 1973 - Mellition

See also
 List of Australian Group races
 Group races

References

Horse races in Australia